The Paper Men is a 1984 novel by British writer William Golding.

Plot Summary 
The protagonist in the novel is Wilfred Barclay, a curmudgeonly writer who has a drinking problem, a dead marriage, and the incurable itches of middle-aged lust.  Barclay is irritated by a young professor, Rick Tucker, who is determined to write Barclay's biography and is desperate to gain control of the writer's personal papers.  Tucker pursues Barclay across Europe, where both men sacrifice relationships, self-respect, and ultimately themselves in this lethal pursuit.

The ending is both inevitable and shocking and exposes the desperation of the literary biographer and the determination of the subject to maintain control over the story of his own life.

References

https://www.webcitation.org/68wD50YDG?url=http://www.william-golding.co.uk/library/the-paper-men.aspx

Novels by William Golding
1984 British novels
Novels about writers
Faber and Faber books